Ching Li (1945-2017) was a Hong Kong actress popular in the 1970s. She appeared in more than 60 films, mostly by Shaw Brothers Studio.

Early life 
On October 29, 1945, Ching was born in mainland China, grew up in Taiwan, and moved to Hong Kong when she was 21. Her father Ching Miao was an actor with the Shaw Brothers Studio.

Career 
Ching starred in the film When the Clouds Roll By, and won the "most promising actress" award at the 1969 Golden Horse Awards.

Personal life 
Ching married Philip Tse (謝宏中), and retired from acting in 1983. They divorced in 1985. She died on 9 December 2017.

Filmography

Films

TV series

References

External links

 HK Cinemagic entry

1945 births
2017 deaths
20th-century Taiwanese actresses
20th-century Hong Kong actresses
Taiwanese film actresses
Taiwanese television actresses
Hong Kong film actresses
Hong Kong television actresses
Taiwanese emigrants to Hong Kong
20th-century Chinese actresses
Chinese film actresses
Chinese television actresses